Bondaholmen is a small island in Kattegat, situated off Trönningenäs in Varberg Municipality, Sweden, between Getterön and Balgö.

Islands on the Swedish West Coast
Varberg Municipality
Landforms of Halland County